Siddharth is a 2013 Indian-Canadian drama film directed by Richie Mehta. It was screened in the Contemporary World Cinema section at the 2013 Toronto International Film Festival. It depicts story of a person who sends his son to work to a distant place for money who later gets lost.

Plot
A man from Delhi goes out to find his missing son and expects that whoever took him returns him unharmed.

Cast
 Rajesh Tailang as Mahendra Saini
 Tannishtha Chatterjee as Suman Saini
 Anurag Arora as Ranjit Gahlot
 Shobha Sharma Jassi as Meena Gahlot
 Geeta Agrawal Sharma as Roshni
 Amitabh Srivasta as Om Prakash
 Mukesh Chhabra as Mukesh-Bhai
 Khushi Mathur as Pinky Saini
 Irfan Khan as Siddharth / Chai Kid / Kamathipura Child
 Salony Luthra as a train passenger

References

External links
 

2013 films
2013 drama films
2010s Hindi-language films
Indian drama films
Canadian drama films
Films directed by Richie Mehta
Films about child trafficking in India
Hindi-language drama films
2010s Canadian films